The Lafayette Roughnecks was arena football team based in Lafayette, Louisiana. The Roughnecks were members of the South Central Division of the National Conference of af2. They played their home games at the Cajundome (also the basketball home for the Louisiana-Lafayette Ragin' Cajuns). They only played for one season (3-13 record) before ceasing all operations after the season ended.

Roughnecks front office staff
Dave Whinham, Vice President
Bill Verret, Statistical Operations
Bill Heim, Stats

Roughnecks coaching staff
Buford Jordan, Head Coach (replaced during season by Whinham)
Dave Whinham, Head Coach
Broderick Fobbs, fullback and linebackers coach

Season-by-season

|-
|2001 || 3 || 13 || 0 || 6th NC South Central || --
|}

References

External links
 Lafayette Roughnecks on ArenaFan.com

 
2000 establishments in Louisiana
2001 disestablishments in Louisiana